Trinity Methodist Episcopal Church is a historic Methodist Episcopal church located near Bridgeville, Sussex County, Delaware.  It was built in 1885, and is a two-story, frame church building in the Gothic Revival style.  It has a gable roof and corner pilasters with lancet insets.  Attached to the church is a Sunday School annex.

It was added to the National Register of Historic Places in 1978.

References

Methodist churches in Delaware
Churches on the National Register of Historic Places in Delaware
Churches completed in 1885
19th-century Methodist church buildings in the United States
Churches in Sussex County, Delaware
National Register of Historic Places in Sussex County, Delaware